Trapeze were an English rock band from Cannock, Staffordshire. Formed in March 1969, the band originally featured former The Montanas members John Jones (vocals, trumpet) and Terry Rowley (keyboards, guitar, flute), as well as former Finders Keepers members Mel Galley (guitar, vocals), Glenn Hughes (bass, piano, vocals) and Dave Holland (drums). After the band released their self-titled debut album in May 1970, Jones and Rowley left to return to The Montanas. Hughes, Galley and Holland released Medusa later in the year and You Are the Music... We're Just the Band in 1972, before Hughes left to join Deep Purple in June 1973. Prior to his departure, Hughes was due to switch to the role of second guitarist, with Pete MacKie set to take his place on bass; however, this never came to fruition.

The band resurfaced in 1974 with second guitarist Rob Kendrick, bassist Pete Wright, returning keyboardist Rowley and Galley on lead vocals, signing to Warner Bros. Records and releasing their fourth album Hot Wire later in the year. A second self-titled album followed in 1975, on which Hughes performed vocals on two tracks. Following the breakup of Deep Purple in 1976, Hughes briefly returned to the band to tour and record with Galley and Holland, although the reunion was short-lived and the recordings surfaced on the bassist's debut solo album Play Me Out in 1977. Wright subsequently returned to Trapeze, and Peter Goalby joined as lead vocalist and second guitarist in time to perform on the band's final studio album Hold On in 1978. Holland later left in August 1979 to join heavy metal band Judas Priest.

In 1981, Trapeze recorded and released their first live album Live in Texas: Dead Armadillos, which featured Holland's replacement Steve Bray on drums, and was the band's last release to feature Goalby before he left to join Uriah Heep later in the year. Bray was replaced by Kex Gorin later in the year, while Mervyn Spence (bass, vocals) and Richard Bailey (keyboards) also joined briefly, before Trapeze split up in 1982 as Galley joined Whitesnake. The Hughes-Galley-Holland lineup of the band reunited in 1991 for a touring cycle which also featured keyboardist Geoff Downes, recording the live album Welcome to the Real World in May the following year. The trio returned again in 1994 to perform a string of shows in the United States and Europe, adding second guitarist Craig Erickson to their lineup.

Members

Timeline

Lineups

References

External links
Trapeze history on Glenn Hughes' official website

Trapeze